Sanicula graveolens is a species of flowering plant in the family Apiaceae known by the common names northern sanicle and Sierra blacksnakeroot. It is native to western North America from British Columbia to Montana to California, and southern South America, including southern Chile. Its habitat includes mountain slopes, forests, and woodlands on serpentine soils. It is a perennial herb producing a slender, branching stem up to half a meter tall from a taproot, with leaves alternate. The lowest leaves have long stalks and are often attached below ground. The upper leaves are smaller, sparse and often sessile. The leaves are compound, the blades each divided into three deeply lobed, toothed leaflets. The herbage is green to purple-tinged to all purple in color. The inflorescence is made up of one or more heads of bisexual and male-only flowers with tiny, curving, yellow petals. Each head has an array of narrow, toothed bracts at its base. The rounded fruits are a few millimeters long, covered in curving prickles, and borne in small clusters.

External links

 Calflora Database: Sanicula graveolens (Northern sanicle,  Sierra sanicle)
Jepson Manual eFlora (TJM2) treatment of Sanicula graveolens
USDA Plants Profile
Washington Burke Museum
U.C. Photos gallery of Sanicula graveolens images

graveolens
Flora of Argentina
Flora of British Columbia
Flora of California
Flora of Chile
Flora of Nevada
Flora of the Northwestern United States
Flora of the Cascade Range
Flora of the Klamath Mountains
Flora of the Sierra Nevada (United States)
Taxa named by Augustin Pyramus de Candolle
Taxa named by Eduard Friedrich Poeppig
Flora without expected TNC conservation status